The following is a list of events, births, and deaths in 1931 in Switzerland.

Incumbents
Federal Council:
Giuseppe Motta 
Edmund Schulthess 
Jean-Marie Musy
Heinrich Häberlin (President)
Marcel Pilet-Golaz
Albert Meyer
Rudolf Minger

Tournaments
1930–31 Swiss Serie A
February 19-February 23-FIS Alpine World Ski Championships 1931
1931–32 Nationalliga

Establishments
FC Alle
FC Wettingen, went bankrupt in 1993, refounded as FC Wettingen 93
SRG SSR, a Swiss public broadcasting organisation

Events by Month

January

February

March
March 31-Hermann Kutter, a Swiss Lutheran theologian, dies

April

May
May 4-Walter Leiser, a Swiss rower, is born
May 19-Éric Tappy, a Swiss singer, is born

June

July
July 4-Karl Weidmann, a Swiss rower, is born
July 27-Auguste Forel, a Swiss myrmecologist, neuroanatomist and psychiatrist, dies

August

September
September 3-Rudolf Kelterborn, a Swiss musician and composer, is born

October
October 4-Charles Weissmann, a Hungarian born Swiss molecular biologist, is born
October 10-Bruno Weber, a Swiss artist and architect is born (d. October 2011)

November
November 5-Konrad Stäheli, a Swiss sports shooter, dies
November 30-Susi Wirz, a Swiss figure skater, is born

December

Other
Friedrich Ris, a Swiss physician and entomologist, dies
Jakob Herzog, a Swiss socialist, dies
Eugen Sutermeister, a Swiss graveur and writer, is born

References

 
Years of the 20th century in Switzerland